Arnold Wilson may refer to:

 Arnold Wilson (1840–1940), British civil commissioner in Baghdad 1918–1920
 Arnold Muir Wilson (1857–1909), British solicitor and politician
 Arnold Manaaki Wilson (1928–2012), New Zealand artist and educator